River View High School (RVHS) is a public high school in Bradshaw, West Virginia. The school is located on the grounds of the old Bradshaw Junior High School, in the mountains of McDowell County, West Virginia. It is one of two high schools in the county, with the other being Mount View High School. Opening in 2010, the school serves grades 9–12. River View High School's colors are purple, black, and silver. The school's sports teams are the Raiders.

References

External links
School website
District website

Public high schools in West Virginia
Schools in McDowell County, West Virginia
Educational institutions established in 2009
2009 establishments in West Virginia